Dowlatabad-e Aqa (also Romanized as Dowlatābād-e Āqā; also known as Dowlatābād and Daulatābād) is a village in Qanavat Rural District, in the Central District of Qom County, Qom Province, Iran. At the 2006 census, its population was 184, in 47 families.

References 

Populated places in Qom Province